The Detroit News Orchestra was the world's first radio orchestra, first broadcasting in 1922. It was composed of already-distinguished members of the Detroit Symphony Orchestra, broadcasting from radio station WWJ in Detroit, Michigan.  The orchestra's broadcasts could be received half way across North America and even as far away as Hawaii.

Background 
The 16 members of the Detroit News Orchestra were drawn from the city's Detroit Symphony Orchestra, having previously achieved distinction as accomplished soloists. The orchestra broadcast on radio station WWJ, debuting on May 28, 1922. The broadcasts were sponsored by The Detroit Bank and could be received across half of North America. 

The Orchestra, sometimes referred to as the "little symphony" by WWJ Detroit News radio station, played at their studio Monday through Friday at 7:00 P.M., as well as at 2:00 P.M. on Sundays.

Listeners in Hawaii 
On November 23, 1922, at thirty minutes past midnight, the Detroit News Orchestra played the waltz "Three O'Clock in the Morning" in studio in the Detroit News building. The transmission was received clearly at 6:30 P.M. local time in the Hawaiian Islands by A. F. Costa, the postmaster there. Several people listened to the program in its entirety at the Wailuku post office, that was more than 4,400 miles (7,100 km) from Detroit. The notes of the music transmitted from the Detroit News radio station in Michigan took about one fiftieth of a second to arrive in Hawaii.

Ensemble 

List of personnel of the musical ensemble.
 Otto E Krueger – conductor
 Maurice Warner – violinist 
 Herman Goldstein – violinist
 LeRoy Hancock – violinist 
 Armand Hebert – violinist 
 Valbert P. Coffey – pianist 
 Frederick Broeder – cellist 
 Eugene W Braunsdorf – bass soloist
 Thomas J Byrne – oboe soloist
 R. M. Arey – clarinetist
 Vincenzo Pezzi – bassoonist 
 Albert Stagliamo – horn player
 Edward Clarke – trumpeter
 Floyd O Hara – trumpeter 
 Max Smith – trombonist
 Arthur Cooper – xylophone player

See also
 1922 in radio

References

Citations

Sources

Further reading 
 

1920 establishments in Michigan
Culture of Detroit
Orchestras based in Michigan
Disbanded American orchestras